Bichl station is a railway station in the municipality of Bichl, in Bavaria, Germany.

Services
 the following services stop at Bichl:

References

External links
 
 Bichl layout 
 

Railway stations in Bavaria
Buildings and structures in Bad Tölz-Wolfratshausen